A tractor unit (also known as a truck unit, power unit, prime mover, ten-wheeler, semi-tractor, tractor truck, semi-truck, tractor cab, truck cab, tractor rig, truck rig or big rig or simply a tractor, truck, semi or rig)  is a characteristically heavy-duty towing engine that provides motive power for hauling a towed or trailered load. These fall into two categories: heavy- and medium-duty military and commercial rear-wheel-drive semi-tractors used for hauling semi-trailers, and very heavy-duty typically off-road-capable, often 6×6, military and commercial tractor units, including ballast tractors.

Overview
Tractor units typically have large displacement diesel engines for power, durability, and economy; several axles; and a multi-ratio transmission (10, 13, or 18 gears) for maximum flexibility in gearing.

The tractor-trailer combination distributes a load across multiple axles while being more maneuverable than an equivalently sized rigid truck. The most common trailer attachment system is a fifth wheel coupling, allowing a rapid shift between trailers performing different functions, such as a bulk tipper and box trailer.  Trailers containing differing cargos can be rapidly swapped between tractors, eliminating downtime while a trailer is unloaded or loaded.

Drawbar couplings are also found, particularly in dedicated exceptionally heavy-duty ballast tractors and as a means to connect intermediate fifth-wheel dollies for pulling multiple semi-trailers.

Configurations

Cab

There have been three common cab configurations used in tractors, two are still widely used.

 The conventional has an engine and hood over the front axle in front of the cab, as in most automobiles. This style is almost universal in North America. 
 The cab over engine or cab forward has a flat nose cab with the driver sitting in front of the front axle. Widely used in the EU and Japan, this style has the advantages of good vision and maneuverability and shorter cab length, at the expense of driver safety in case of an accident. In North America, this type of cab can be useful in rigid trucks, but now has little advantage in tractors and is rarely used. 
 A North American style cab over engine, now largely obsolete, had a flat nose cab located higher over the engine, with the driver sitting above the front axle. This allowed a sleeper compartment in a short tractor, and maximum wheelbase relative overall length, important for bridge formula weight restrictions. With the loosening of length restrictions in 1982 this style had limited applications, and is no longer manufactured for the U.S. market. This style is still however popular in Australia and New Zealand where length restrictions apply and it is used to maximise the capacity of both single trailer and B double configurations, and American companies Freightliner and Kenworth still manufacture trucks in this style for this market. In Australia both styles of cab over engine truck as well as conventionals are in common use.

Axle

A tractor unit can have many axles depending on axle load legislation. The most common varieties are those of 4×2, 6×2, and 6×4 types. However, some manufacturers offer 6×6, 8x4, 8×6, 8×8, 10×8, and 10×10 axle configurations. A 6×4 has three axles, normally an undriven front steer axle and the two rear axles driven. 6×4 units are more common in long-distance haulage in larger countries such as the United States and Australia. In Europe, the 4×2 and 6×2 variants are more commonplace.

Tractors with three axles or more can have more than one steering axle, which can also be driven. Most 6×2 units allow the undriven rear axle to be raised when lightly loaded, or running without a trailer, to save tire wear, save toll road fees, and increase traction on the driven axle.  The 6×6 units have three axles, all can be driven, and 8×6 units have four axles, with either the rear three driven and the front axle not, or the front and rear-most two axles powered and an unpowered lifting center axle to spread the load when needed. The 8×8 units also have four axles, but with all of them driven, and 10×8 units have five axles with the rear four usually driven and the front axle for steering. All five axles of 10×10 units are driven. The front two axles are usually both steer axles. The axle configurations are usually based on axle load legislation, and maximum gross vehicle weight ratings (BDM).

Heavier versions of tractor units, such as those used in heavy haulage and road trains, tend to have four or more axles, with more than two axles driven. In certain countries (such as Switzerland), a certain amount of weight must be spread over driven axles, which led to heavier varieties having six-wheel drive, otherwise, another tractor unit would have to be used. Heavy haulage variants of tractor-units are often turned into a ballast tractor by fitting temporary ballast, which may require special permitting.

See also

 Articulated vehicle
 Artillery tractor
 Ballast tractor
 Cab over
 Gladhand connector
 Road train
 Mechanical Horse
 Semi-trailer truck
 Terminal tractor
 Toter
 Tractor
 Truck sleeper

See also

Notes

References

External links
 

Trucks
Articulated vehicles